Ussuriana michaelis is a butterfly of the family Lycaenidae. It was described by Charles Oberthür in 1881. It is found in the Russian Far East (Primorye), China, Korea and Taiwan.

Subspecies
Ussuriana michaelis michaelis
Ussuriana michaelis gabrielis (Leech, 1894)
Ussuriana michaelis kham N. Nakamura & Wakahara, 2001 (Laos)
Ussuriana michaelis okamensis Fujioka, 1992 (China: Kwang-tong)
Ussuriana michaelis secunda Fujioka, 1992 (China: Szechuan)

References

Butterflies described in 1881
Theclini
Taxa named by Charles Oberthür
Butterflies of Asia